Uskoci may refer to:

Uskoks (Uskoci)
Uskoci, Croatia, a village in the municipality of Stara Gradiška